All Sports is the first greatest hits album by Australian rock and pop band The Sports, released in December 1982. The album peaked at number 35 on the Australian Kent Music Report.

Reception

Steve Schnee from AllMusic said "This collection compiles the best singles, a few album tracks, and alternate recordings, creating a fun stroll through the musical history of one of Australia's pub rock greats." but said it's "one of the ugliest album covers in musical history".

Track listing

Charts

References

The Sports albums
Mushroom Records compilation albums
1982 greatest hits albums
Compilation albums by Australian artists